Coral Gables Gazette was an online newspaper based in Coral Gables, Florida covering Coral Gables, South Miami, Coconut Grove, Pinecrest and Brickell. The newspaper was owned by Limestone Communications, Inc. The paper was in publication from 2009 to 2012.

References

Defunct newspapers published in Florida
Coral Gables, Florida
2009 establishments in Florida
Publications established in 2009
2012 disestablishments in Florida
Publications disestablished in 2012